Lucienne Robillard  (born June 16, 1945) is a Canadian politician and a member of the Liberal Party of Canada. She sat in the House of Commons of Canada as the member of Parliament for the riding of Westmount—Ville-Marie in Montreal, Quebec.

Robillard had a career as a social worker before entering politics. In the Quebec election of 1989, she was elected to the National Assembly of Quebec in the riding of Chambly as a member of the Quebec Liberal Party. She was appointed to the provincial cabinet of Premier Robert Bourassa as Minister of Cultural Affairs. In 1992, she became Minister of Education, and then served as Minister of Health and Social Services from 1994 until the defeat of the Liberal government.

She then moved to federal politics as a star candidate when she was elected to the House of Commons of Canada in a by-election in the safe Liberal riding of Westmount—Ville-Marie. Jean Chrétien appointed her to the federal cabinet as Minister of Labour and Minister responsible for the federal campaign in the 1995 Quebec referendum.

In 1996, she became Minister of Citizenship and Immigration. On August 3, 1999, she assumed the responsibilities of President of the Treasury Board.

When Paul Martin became Prime Minister of Canada in 2003, he moved Robillard to the position of Minister of Industry and Minister of the Economic Development Agency of Canada for the Regions of Quebec.  With the cabinet shuffle that followed the 2004 election, she became Minister of Intergovernmental Affairs and President of the Queen's Privy Council for Canada.

Upon Judy Sgro's resignation from Cabinet on January 14, 2005, Joe Volpe moved to fill the vacant position of Minister of Citizenship and Immigration, and Robillard assumed his prior responsibilities as Minister of Human Resources and Skills Development. When Belinda Stronach crossed the floor and joined the Liberals in the House of Commons on May 17, 2005, she replaced Robillard as Minister of Human Resources and Skills Development.

On February 1, 2006, she was named deputy leader of the Liberal Party in the House of Commons by Interim Leader Bill Graham.  She held this post until the newly elected leader, Stéphane Dion (who represents the nearby riding of Saint-Laurent—Cartierville), in accordance with the customary Anglophone/Francophone division of duties, appointed the Anglophone Michael Ignatieff as his deputy.

On April 4, 2007, she announced she would not run in the next election. She resigned her seat on January 25, 2008.

In 2010 she became co-chair of the election campaign for the Liberal Party of Canada in Quebec.  In May 2010 she was elected President of the Liberal Party of Canada (Quebec) (LPCQ) by the Board of directors to replace Marc Lavigne who had resigned for personal reasons a few months after having been elected by the delegates at the October 2009 convention.  Lucienne Robillard was also co-chair of the Electoral Commission of the LPCQ in 2010 and 2011 until the commission was dissolved at the start of the 2011 electoral campaign.

As president of the LPCQ she also sits on the National Board of Directors of the Liberal Party of Canada.

Electoral record

External links
 
 

1945 births
Women government ministers of Canada
Women members of the House of Commons of Canada
Liberal Party of Canada MPs
Living people
Members of the Executive Council of Quebec
Members of the House of Commons of Canada from Quebec
Members of the Order of Canada
Members of the King's Privy Council for Canada
Ministers of Labour of Canada
Politicians from Montreal
Quebec Liberal Party MNAs
Women MNAs in Quebec
Members of the 26th Canadian Ministry
Members of the 27th Canadian Ministry
21st-century Canadian women politicians
20th-century Canadian women politicians